Ahmetbey can refer to:

 Ahmetbey, Kastamonu
 Ahmetbey, Osmangazi